In Person is a Canadian music variety television series which aired on CBC Television from 1966 to 1968.

Premise
For the first season, each episode featured a different host such as Alex Barris, Tommy Common, Doug Crosley, Don Francks, Wally Koster, and Gordon Pinsent. Guests in that season included Dave Broadfoot, Cy Leonard, Billy Meek, The Staccatos, and Flip Wilson.

For the second season (1967–1968), Alan Hamel became a regular host. Guests that season included Tommy Ambrose, Jack Duffy, Ian and Sylvia, Gordon Lightfoot, and Rich Little. Some episodes were recorded at Expo 67 in Montreal, as the series often ventured outside the normal studio setting.

Scheduling
This series was broadcast on Saturday nights following Hockey Night in Canada to cover the available time slot until CBC's national newscast that night. Its debut was 17 December 1966 and ran until 11 May 1968, with the series interrupted between television seasons during mid-1967.

References

External links
 

CBC Television original programming
1966 Canadian television series debuts
1968 Canadian television series endings